Joseph Patrick McGinley (1894–1974) was an Irish Sinn Féin, and later Fine Gael, politician and medical practitioner. He was elected unopposed as a Sinn Féin Teachta Dála (TD) to the Second Dáil at the 1921 elections for the Donegal constituency. He supported the Anglo-Irish Treaty and voted in favour of it. He was elected unopposed as a pro-Treaty Sinn Féin TD at the 1922 general election. He did not contest the 1923 general election.

In 1948 he was the Fine Gael candidate in the Donegal East by-election caused by the death of Neal Blaney. He was defeated by Blaney's son, Neil Blaney of Fianna Fáil.

References

1894 births
1974 deaths
Early Sinn Féin TDs
Members of the 2nd Dáil
Members of the 3rd Dáil
Politicians from County Donegal
20th-century Irish medical doctors
People of the Irish Civil War (Pro-Treaty side)
Fine Gael politicians